Little Mountain Sound Studios is a music recording facility in Vancouver, British Columbia, Canada. During the 1970s, 1980s, and 1990s, it was the most successful recording studio in Western Canada and the home for many years to producers Bruce Fairbairn and Bob Rock. It recorded albums by Aerosmith, Bon Jovi, AC/DC, Metallica, Bryan Adams, Mötley Crüe, David Lee Roth, Loverboy, and the Cult, among many others. In the mid 1990s, it became part of Vancouver Studios, which eventually evolved into Greenhouse Studios, where albums by Nickelback, k.d. lang, Default and Queensrÿche were recorded.

History
Little Mountain Sound Studios was started in 1972 as a 50/50 partnership between Western Broadcasting (CKNW radio) and Griffiths, Gibson Productions (GGP). 

Bob Brooks was hired to manage Little Mountain. Brooks was an independent producer working out of an office at CKWX after having left Homer Street Studios. In 1977, Western Broadcasting bought out GGP to become sole owner. In 1982, Western Broadcasting sold the studio to Bob Brooks.

Bruce Fairbairn started recording at Little Mountain Sound Studios with Prism, a band in which he played trumpet. Fairbairn would go on to do the bulk of his work there as an independent producer. Bob Rock was a house engineer at Little Mountain, and engineered many albums for Fairbairn before becoming a producer himself.

Brooks turned over the running of the studio to a manager in the late 1980s. Brooks then replaced the manager with Bruce Levens.

Levens purchased Little Mountain after managing for six months.

Little Mountain relocated to Burnaby after closing in Vancouver at the end of 1993. For the next decade, Little Mountain was an equipment and services company to various producers, engineers, studios, and bands. Bruce Levens continued to provide sound recording services through Greenhouse Studios.

Little Mountain moved back to Vancouver in 2008.  The company continues to provide production space to music creators and has been in business for more than 45 years.

Clients

 Aerosmith recorded their trilogy of comeback albums, Permanent Vacation, Pump, and the monster seller Get a Grip with Bruce Fairbairn producing.
 The Cheer (single Shot With Our Own Guns) Bob Rock producing. Mike Fraser engineering.
 Bon Jovi recorded their three most commercially successful albums with Fairbairn and Bob Rock.  Slippery When Wet, New Jersey and Keep the Faith were also recorded at Little Mountain.
 Bryan Adams recorded parts of his worldwide breakthrough Reckless at Little Mountain.
 The Goose Creek Symphony Head Foe The Hills 1976
 Mötley Crüe also recorded their biggest seller Dr. Feelgood with Bob Rock.  Decade of Decadence was also recorded at Little Mountain.
 David Coverdale and Jimmy Page did the initial recording of their album at Little Mountain with Mike Fraser producing.
 Metallica recorded parts of their most successful album Metallica at Little Mountain.
 Loverboy recorded much of their catalog at Little Mountain.
 The Cult recorded their multi-platinum seller Sonic Temple (1989).
 Poison recorded Flesh and Blood at the studio, the album featured the singles "Unskinny Bop" and "Something to Believe in".
 Olivia Newton-John recorded and remixed "Don't Cry For Me Argentina" in 1977, engineered by Armin Steiner.
 Van Halen recorded vocals for their 1995 album Balance with Fairbairn producing.
 The British Columbia Rapid Transit Company (now part of Translink) recorded the chimes for the Skytrain system in 1984–1985.

The studio itself can be seen and figures prominently in the Aerosmith DVD The Making of Pump (1990)

References

Recording studios in Canada
Music of Vancouver
Entertainment companies established in 1972